The following list presents the official temperature extremes recorded in Portugal by the Portuguese meteorological institute (IPMA) in official WMO stations.

Highest Temperatures Recorded

Lowest Temperatures Recorded

(*) Stations created prior to 1941 and no longer in use

References

Weather extremes of Earth
Portugal
Weather events in Portugal
Climate of Portugal